Halle–Ingooigem is a single-day road bicycle race held annually in June in West Flanders, Belgium. Since 2005, the race is organized as a 1.1 event on the UCI Europe Tour. It was called Brussels–Ingooigem until 2004.

Winners

Notes

References

External links
 

UCI Europe Tour races
Recurring sporting events established in 1945
1945 establishments in Belgium
Cycle races in Belgium